Gunn Olsen (18 September 1952 – 27 December 2013) was a Norwegian politician for the Labour Party.

Background 
Olsen was born in Kragerø the daughter of a mechanic and a housewife. She went to commerce school in 1969 but chose not to attend a higher education institution. Instead she was an office clerk in the newspaper Telemark Arbeiderblad from 1969 to 1990.

Political career 
She was a member of Telemark county council from 1983 to 1999, serving as deputy county mayor from 1990 to 1995. She has chaired the county party chapter, and been a member of the Labour Party national board. In the municipal council of Kragerø she has only been a deputy member, from 1979 to 1983.

She served as a deputy representative to the Norwegian Parliament from Telemark during the terms 1985–1989 and 1989–1993. She was elected as a full representative in 1997, and was re-elected in 2001, 2005 and 2009. She sat on a different Standing Committee during each of her four parliamentary terms.

Death 
Olsen did not stand for re-election in 2013 because she had been diagnosed with cancer. She died from this disease in December 2013 at Marienlyst in Kragerø.

References 

1952 births
2013 deaths
People from Kragerø
Politicians from Telemark
Labour Party (Norway) politicians
Members of the Storting
Women members of the Storting
Deaths from cancer in Norway
21st-century Norwegian politicians
21st-century Norwegian women politicians
20th-century Norwegian politicians
20th-century Norwegian women politicians